Warhawk Field is a baseball venue located in Monroe, Louisiana.  It is home to the Louisiana–Monroe Warhawks college baseball team of the Division I Sun Belt Conference.  The venue was opened in 1983 and has a capacity of 1,800 spectators.

The field features a hybrid bermuda grass surface, practice facilities, offices, and tailgate areas located down both foul lines.

In 2013, the Warhawks ranked 44th among Division I baseball programs in attendance, averaging 1,439 per home game.

See also
 List of NCAA Division I baseball venues

References

Baseball venues in Louisiana
College baseball venues in the United States
Louisiana–Monroe Warhawks baseball
Sports venues in Monroe, Louisiana
1983 establishments in Louisiana
Sports venues completed in 1983
Southland Conference Baseball Tournament venues